3rd from the Sun is the sixth studio album by the experimental rock band Chrome. It was released May 26, 1982 by Don't Fall Off the Mountain.

Musical style 
The Quietus described the album's musical style as "gothic space rock".

Reception 

AllMusic gave 3rd from the Sun the highest rating of any Chrome album, while CMJ New Music Monthly called the album "magnificent".

Track listing

Personnel 
 Chrome

 Helios Creed – vocals, guitar, production
 Damon Edge – vocals, Moog synthesizer, production, mixing
 Hilary Stench – bass guitar
 John Stench – drums

 Additional personnel

 Fabienne Shine – backing vocals on "Off the Line" and "Shadows of a Thousand Years"

 Technical

 Gary Mankin – recording
 Bernie Grundman – mastering

References

External links 

 

1982 albums
Beggars Banquet Records albums
Chrome (band) albums